Catha may refer to:

 Catha (plant), a plant genus
 Catha (mythology), an Etruscan goddess

See also
 Katha (disambiguation)